Glutamate—cysteine ligase catalytic subunit is an enzyme that in humans is encoded by the GCLC gene.

Function 

Glutamate-cysteine ligase, also known as gamma-glutamylcysteine synthetase is the first rate limiting enzyme of glutathione synthesis. The enzyme consists of two subunits, a heavy catalytic subunit and a light regulatory subunit. The gene encoding the catalytic subunit encodes a protein of 367 amino acids with a calculated molecular weight of 72.773 kDa and maps to chromosome 6. The regulatory subunit is derived from a different gene located on chromosome 1p22-p21. Deficiency of gamma-glutamylcysteine synthetase in human is associated with enzymopathic hemolytic anemia.

Model organisms 

Model organisms have been used in the study of GCLC function. A conditional knockout mouse line, called Gclctm1a(EUCOMM)Wtsi was generated as part of the International Knockout Mouse Consortium program — a high-throughput mutagenesis project to generate and distribute animal models of disease to interested scientists — at the Wellcome Trust Sanger Institute.

Male and female animals underwent a standardized phenotypic screen to determine the effects of deletion. Twenty four tests were carried out on mutant mice, however no significant abnormalities were observed.

References

Further reading 

 
 
 
 
 
 
 
 
 
 
 
 
 
 
 
 
 
 

Genes mutated in mice